Faiek Davids (born 1 September 1964) is a former South African first-class cricketer. A big hitting lower to middle order batsman, he played with Western Province and Boland during the 1990s, after earlier appearing in the Howa Bowl.

References

External links

1964 births
Living people
South African cricketers
Western Province cricketers
Boland cricketers
South African cricket coaches